Wandy Luis Peralta Dominguez (born July 27, 1991) is a Dominican professional baseball pitcher for the New York Yankees of Major League Baseball (MLB). He has previously played in MLB for the Cincinnati Reds and San Francisco Giants. Peralta signed with the Reds as an amateur free agent in 2010 and made his MLB debut in 2016.

Career

Cincinnati Reds
Peralta signed with the Cincinnati Reds as an amateur free agent in May 2010. He was called up to the majors for the first time on September 2, 2016. He pitched to an 8.59 earned run average (ERA) in ten games.

Peralta made the Reds' 2017 Opening Day roster. He won his first major league game against the St. Louis Cardinals on April 30, 2017. In 69 games in 2017, he went 3–4 with a 3.76 ERA in  innings.

In 2018, Peralta struggled with control and inconsistency, going 2–2 for Cincinnati and walking and striking out 31 in  innings while accumulating a 5.36 ERA. Pitching 13 games for the AAA Louisville Bats, he was 1–0 with a 3.14 ERA in  innings. In 2019 for Cincinnati he was 1–1 with a 6.09 ERA in 39 games in which he pitched 34 innings. Pitching for Louisville he was 0–0 with a 3.27 ERA in 11 innings.

San Francisco Giants
On September 7, 2019, the San Francisco Giants claimed Peralta off waivers. With the Giants in 2019, he was 0–0 with a 3.18 ERA in eight relief appearances covering  innings. In 2020, he was 1–1 with a 3.29 ERA over  innings. Peralta earned his first career save in a 10th inning 3–2 victory over the San Diego Padres in April 2021.

New York Yankees
On April 27, 2021, the Giants traded Peralta and Connor Cannon to the New York Yankees in exchange for outfielder Mike Tauchman. He had a 2.95 ERA for the Yankees in 2021 and signed a $2.15 million contract for the 2022 season.

In 2022, Peralta was 3-4 with four saves and a 2.72 ERA. He pitched in all five games of the 2022 American League Division Series, becoming the first pitcher to do so.

References

External links

1991 births
Living people
Águilas Cibaeñas players
Arizona League Reds players
Bakersfield Blaze players
Cincinnati Reds players
Dayton Dragons players
Dominican Republic expatriate baseball players in the United States
Dominican Summer League Reds players
Louisville Bats players
Major League Baseball players from the Dominican Republic
Major League Baseball pitchers
New York Yankees players
Pensacola Blue Wahoos players
People from San Francisco de Macorís
San Francisco Giants players